Gerard Woodward (born 1961) is a British novelist, poet and short story writer, best known for his trilogy of novels concerning the troubled Jones family, the second of which, I'll Go to Bed at Noon, was shortlisted for the 2004 Man Booker Prize.

Biography
Woodward was born in North London and attended St Ignatius College, a Jesuit comprehensive school, leaving at 16 to work for two years in a variety of jobs before  studying painting at Falmouth School of Art in Cornwall. He dropped out in his second year but later attended the London School of Economics, where he studied Social Anthropology, and Manchester University, where he studied for an MA in the same subject.

In 1989 he won a major Eric Gregory Award for poets under 30 and his first collection of poetry, Householder, won the Somerset Maugham Award in 1991. His first novel, August, was shortlisted for the Whitbread Award. In 2011 he was writer in residence at Columbia College, Chicago. He has taught or been a writer in residence in many countries including China, Greece, Sweden, Slovenia and Ireland. He is currently Professor of Fiction at Bath Spa University.

Awards

1989 Eric Gregory Award
1991 Householder made Poetry Book Society Choice
1991 Somerset Maugham Award
1991 J.L.Rhys Award
1994 After The Deafening made Poetry Book Society Choice
1994 T.S.Eliot Prize (shortlisted)
1996 Glen Rybertt Award
2001 Whitbread First Novel Award (shortlisted)
2004 Man Booker Prize (shortlisted)
2004 Encore Award (shortlisted)
2005 Fellow of The Royal Society of Literature
2011 Sunday Times Short Story Award (shortlisted)
2014 Jerwood Fiction Uncovered Prize
2017 O.Henry Award
2019 Honorary Doctorate Middlesex University

Bibliography

Poetry
The Unwriter & Other Poems (1989)
Householder (1991), 
After the Deafening (1994), 
Island to Island (1999), 
We Were Pedestrians (2005), 
The Seacunny (2012)
The Vulture (2022)

Fiction
August (2001), shortlisted for the 2001 Whitbread Book Awards
I'll Go to Bed at Noon (2004), shortlisted for the 2004 Man Booker Prize
A Curious Earth (2007)
Caravan Thieves (short stories; 2008)
Nourishment (2010; published as Letters from an Unknown Woman in the US)
Vanishing (2014)
Legoland (short stories; 2016), 
The Paper Lovers (2018)

References

1961 births
Living people
Alumni of Falmouth University
Alumni of the London School of Economics
20th-century English novelists
21st-century English novelists
English male poets
Academics of Bath Spa University
Fellows of the Royal Society of Literature
English male novelists
20th-century English male writers
21st-century English male writers